Battle of Słońca was a battle fought in 1238, during the first war against Swietopelk II. It was fought near the settlement of Słońca by defending forces of Mecklenburgian troops led by Sambor II, exiled leader of recently conquered Duchy of Lubiszewo against the attacking Duchy of Gdańsk led by Swietopelk II. The battle had ended with Gdańsk victory and capture of Sambor II.

History 
In 1237 or at the beginning of 1238, as part of the war against Duchy of Gdańsk led by Swietopelk II, Sambor II with his army of the Mecklenburgian troops had attacked and occupied the settlement of Słońca, that belonged to Gdańsk. On 1 March 1238, Sambor II, together with Mecklenburgian troops, had traveled to Białogarda, in order to pursue duke Ratibor, to unite in the war against Swietopelk II. Soon after that, Swietopelk II had defeated Sambor in the battle near Słońca, capturing him and keeping him captive in the settlement until around 1239. Słońca was reincorporated into the Duchy of Gdańsk.

Citations

Notes

References

Bibliography 
 Marek Smoliński, Świętopełk Gdański

Battles of the Middle Ages
History of Pomerania
Conflicts in 1238
13th century in Europe